The 2007–08 Primeira Liga was the 74th edition of the Primeira Liga, the top professional league for Portuguese association football clubs. It started on 17 August 2007 and ended on 11 May 2008, with the fixtures announced on 12 July 2007. Porto were the two-time defending champions, having won their 22nd title the previous season, and secured a third consecutive title for the second time in their history.

Porto and Sporting CP were both qualified for the 2008–09 UEFA Champions League group stage; Benfica, Marítimo and Vitória de Setúbal qualified for the 2008–09 UEFA Cup; in opposite, Boavista and União de Leiria were relegated to the Liga de Honra. Lisandro López was the top scorer with 24 goals.

Promotion and relegation

Teams relegated to Liga de Honra 
Desportivo das Aves
Beira Mar

Desportivo das Aves and Beira-Mar were both consigned to Liga de Honra following their final classification in 2006–07.

Teams promoted from Liga de Honra 
Leixões
Vitória de Guimarães

Desportivo das Aves and Beira-Mar will be replaced by two promoted teams from the Liga de Honra. The first is Leixões, who clinched the second level title, and are returning to the top level since their last participation in 1989. The other was Vitória de Guimarães, who managed to return to the Liga after a brief spell in the Liga de Honra.

Club information

Managerial changes

League table

Results

Season statistics

Scoring 
First goal of the season: Derlei for Sporting CP against Académica (17 August 2007)
Fastest goal in a match: Kanú (2 minutes) for Marítimo against Boavista (26 August 2007)
Goal scored at the latest point in a match: Udo Nwoko (90'+3') for Leixões against Benfica (18 August 2007)
Widest winning margin: Porto 6–0 Estrela da Amadora (28 April 2008)
The first hat-trick: by Lito in Académica 3–3 Estrela da Amadora (4 November 2007)
Most goals in a match:Benfica 6–1 Boavista (11 November 2007)Boavista 4–3 Paços de Ferreira (3 February 2008) Cards 
First yellow card: Pedro Roma for Académica against Sporting CP (17 August 2007)First red card: Rodrigo Silva for Nacional against Estrela da Amadora (18 August 2007) Top scorers 

Source: Footballzz

 Awards 

 Footballer of the Year 

Monthly awards

SJPF Player of the Month

SJPF Young Player of the Month

SJPF Fair Play AwardSource: sjpf.pt (Portuguese)''

See also 
 Apito Dourado

References

External links 
 Calendar of the Portuguese League

Primeira Liga seasons
Port
1